The Canton of Prades is a French former canton of the Pyrénées-Orientales department, in the Languedoc-Roussillon region. It had 13,626 inhabitants (2012). It was disbanded following the French canton reorganisation which came into effect in March 2015.

The canton comprised the following communes:

Prades 
Campôme
Casteil
Catllar
Clara-Villerach
Codalet
Conat
Corneilla-de-Conflent
Eus
Fillols
Fuilla
Los Masos
Molitg-les-Bains
Mosset
Nohèdes
Ria-Sirach
Taurinya
Urbanya
Vernet-les-Bains
Villefranche-de-Conflent

References

Prades
2015 disestablishments in France
States and territories disestablished in 2015